The Long Turkish War or Thirteen Years' War was an indecisive land war between the Habsburg Monarchy and the Ottoman Empire, primarily over the Principalities of Wallachia, Transylvania, and Moldavia. It was waged from 1593 to 1606 but in Europe it is sometimes called the Fifteen Years War, reckoning from the 1591–92 Turkish campaign that captured Bihać.

In the series of Ottoman wars in Europe it was the major test of force between the Ottoman–Venetian War (1570–73) and the Cretan War (1645–69). The next of the major Ottoman-Habsburg wars was the Austro-Turkish War of 1663–1664. Overall, the conflict consisted in a large number of costly battles and sieges, but with little gain for either side.

Overview
The major participants of the war were the Habsburg Monarchy, the Principality of Transylvania, Wallachia, and Moldavia opposing the Ottoman Empire. Ferrara, Tuscany, Mantua, and the Papal State were also involved to a lesser extent.

War funding 
The Turkenkriege rallied larger than usual support behind the Holy Roman Emperor. The Reichstag convened in 1594 and voted a substantial tax grant, renewing this four years later and again in 1603. Some 20 million florins were promised and at least four-fifths actually reached the imperial treasury. A further 7 to 8 million florins were paid when Rudolf appealed to the Circle assemblies as well, giving a total of 23 to 28 million florins yielded by the minor German princes. The Habsburg monarchy itself raised around 20 million florins. Another 7.1 million flowed in from Italy, including both Imperial Italy and Papal and Spanish territories outside of the Emperor's formal rule, as well as from Spain itself.Wilson, Peter H. (2009). "Europe's Tragedy: A History of the Thirty Years War." Allen Lane. Page 98.

Prelude
Skirmishes along the Habsburg–Ottoman border intensified from 1591. In 1592, the fort of Bihać fell to the Ottomans following the siege of Bihać (1592).

History

1593
In the spring of 1593, Ottoman forces from the Eyalet of Bosnia laid siege to the city of Sisak in Croatia, starting the Battle of Sisak that eventually ended in a victory for the Christian forces on June 22, 1593. That victory marked the end of the Hundred Years' Croatian–Ottoman War (1493-1593).

The Long Turkish War started on July 29, 1593, when the Ottoman army under Sinan Pasha launched a campaign against the Habsburg Monarchy and captured Győr and Komárom in 1594.

1594
In early 1594, the Serbs in Banat rose up against the Ottomans. The rebels had, in the character of a holy war, carried war flags with the icon of Saint Sava. The war banners were consecrated by Patriarch Jovan Kantul, and the uprising was aided by Serbian Orthodox metropolitans Rufim Njeguš of Cetinje and Visarion of Trebinje. In response, Ottoman Grand Vizier Koca Sinan Pasha demanded that the green flag of the Prophet Muhammed be brought from Damascus to counter the Serb flag and ordered that the sarcophagus containing the relics of Saint Sava be removed from the Mileševa monastery and transferred to Belgrade via military convoy. Along the way, the Ottoman convoy killed all the people in its path as a warning to the rebels. The Ottomans publicly incinerated the relics of Saint Sava on a pyre atop the Vračar plateau on April 27 and had the ashes scattered.

1595–96
In 1595, an alliance of Christian European powers was organized by Pope Clement VIII to oppose the Ottoman Empire (the Holy League of Pope Clement VIII); a treaty of alliance was signed in Prague by the Holy Roman Emperor, Rudolf II and Sigismund Báthory of Transylvania. Aron Vodă of Moldavia and Michael the Brave of Wallachia joined the alliance later that year. The Spanish Habsburgs sent an army of 6,000 experienced infantry and 2,000 cavalry from the Netherlands under Karl von Mansfeld, commander-in-chief of the Spanish Army of Flanders, who took command of the operations in Hungary.

The Ottomans' objective in the war was to seize Vienna,  while the Habsburg Monarchy wanted to recapture the central territories of the Kingdom of Hungary controlled by the Ottoman Empire. Control of the Danube line and possession of the fortresses located there was crucial. The war was mainly fought in Royal Hungary (mostly present-day western Hungary and southern Slovakia), Transdanubia, Royal Croatia and Slavonia, the Ottoman Empire (Rumelia – present-day Bulgaria and Serbia), and Wallachia (in present-day southern Romania).

In 1595, the Christians, led by Mansfeld, captured Esztergom and Visegrád, strategic fortresses on the Danube, but they did not lay siege to the key fortress of Buda. The Ottomans launched a siege of Eger, conquering it in 1596.

In 1595 in the Balkans, a Spanish fleet of galleys from the Kingdom of Naples and Kingdom of Sicily under Pedro de Toledo, marquis of Villafranca, sacked Patras, on the Rumelia Eyalet of the Ottoman Empire, in retaliation for Turkish raids against the Italian coasts. The raid was so spectacular that Sultan Murad III discussed exterminating the Christians of Constantinople in revenge. He finally decided to order the expulsion of all unmarried Greeks from the city. In the following years, Spanish fleets continued to raid the Levant waters, but large-scale naval warfare between Christians and Ottomans did not resume. Instead, privateers such as Alonso de Contreras took on the role of harassing Ottoman ships.

On the eastern front of the war, Michael the Brave, prince of Wallachia, started a campaign against the Ottomans in the autumn of 1594, conquering several castles near the Lower Danube, including Giurgiu, Brăila, Hârşova, and Silistra, while his Moldavian allies defeated the Ottoman armies in Iaşi and other parts of Moldova. Michael continued his attacks deep within the Ottoman Empire, taking the forts of Nicopolis, Ribnice, and Chilia, and even reaching as far as Adrianople. At one point his forces were only  from the Ottoman capital, Constantinople.

He was however forced to fall back across the Danube, and the Ottomans in turn led a massive counter-offensive (100,000 strong) which aimed to not only take back their recently captured possessions but also conquer Wallachia once and for all. The push was initially successful, managing to capture not only Giurgiu but also Bucharest and Târgovişte, despite fierce opposition at Călugăreni (23 August 1595). At this point the Ottoman command grew complacent and stopped pursuing the retreating Wallachian army, focusing instead on fortifying Târgovişte and Bucharest and considering their task all but done. Michael had to wait almost two months for aid from his allies to arrive, but when it did his counter-offensive took the Ottomans by surprise, managing to sweep through the Ottoman defences on three successive battlefields, at Târgovişte (18 October), Bucharest (22 October), and Giurgiu (26 October). The Battle of Giurgiu in particular was devastating for the Ottoman forces, which had to retreat across the Danube in disarray.

The war between Wallachia and the Ottomans continued until late 1599, when Michael was unable to continue the war due to poor support from his allies.

The turning point of the war was the Battle of Mezőkeresztes, which took place in the territory of Hungary on October 24–26, 1596. The combined Habsburg-Transylvanian force of 45–50,000 troops was defeated by the Ottoman army. The battle turned when Christian soldiers, thinking they had won the battle, stopped fighting in order to plunder the Ottoman camp. Despite this victory, the Ottomans realized for the first time the superiority of Western military equipment over Ottoman weapons. This battle was the first significant military encounter in Central Europe between a large Christian army and the Ottoman Turkish Army after the Battle of Mohács. Nevertheless, Austrians recaptured Győr and Komarom in 1598.

1601–06

In August 1601, at the Battle of Goroszló, Giorgio Basta and Michael the Brave defeated the Hungarian nobility led by Sigismund Báthory, who accepted Ottoman protection. After the assassination of Michael the Brave by mercenary soldiers under Basta's orders, the Transylvanian nobility, led by Mózes Székely, was again defeated at the Battle of Brassó in 1603 by the Habsburg Empire and Wallachian troops led by Radu Şerban. Hence, the Austrians seemed to be able to win a decisive victory.

In September 1601, armies of the Holy Roman Empire laid siege to Nagykanizsa. Despite the numerical superiority, coalition armies had to abandon the siege 2 months later, due to heavy losses.

The last phase of the war (from 1604 to 1606) corresponds to the uprising of the Prince of Transylvania Stephen Bocskay. When Rudolf – mostly based on false charges – started prosecutions against a number of noble men in order to fill up the court's exhausted treasury, Bocskay, an educated strategist, resisted. He collected desperate Hungarians together with disappointed members of the nobility to start an uprising against the Habsburgs ruler.  The troops marched westwards, supported by the Hajduk of Hungary, won some victories and regained the territories that had been lost to the Habsburg army until Bocskay was first declared the Prince of Transylvania (Marosvásárhely, February 21, 1605) and later also of Hungary (Szerencs, April 17, 1605). The Ottoman Empire supported Bocskay with a crown that he refused (being Christian). As Prince of Hungary he accepted negotiations with Rudolf II and concluded the Treaty of Vienna (1606).

Aftermath

The Long War ended with the Peace of Zsitvatorok on November 11, 1606, with meagre territorial gains for the two main empires—the Ottomans won the fortresses of Eger, Esztergom, and Kanisza, but gave the region of Vác (which they had occupied since 1541) to Austria. The treaty confirmed the Ottomans' inability to penetrate further into Habsburg territories. It also demonstrated that Transylvania was beyond Habsburg power. Though Emperor Rudolf had failed in his war objectives, he nonetheless won some prestige thanks to this resistance to the Ottomans, by presenting the war as a victory. The treaty stabilized conditions on the Habsburg–Ottoman frontier. Also, Bocskay managed to retain his independence, but he also agreed to give up the title of "King of Hungary".

Rudolf portrayed himself as victorious in the Long War, but this did not protect him from the Habsburg family's internal politics. Rudolf, by the end of the war, had massive debts to lenders, border troops and the field army, made concessions with the Hungarian nobility, and disappointed the princes of the Holy Roman Empire who had subsidized the Habsburg-Ottoman frontier. Once peace was concluded with the Ottomans, the Habsburgs turned on one another. This struggle forced the family to confront the unresolved matter of Rudolf's successor and culminated in the childless Emperor Rudolf being pitted against his brother Matthias in the Brothers' Quarrel.

Battles

 

 Battle of Sisak
 Siege of Veszprém
 (1593) Siege of Tata
 (1593) Battle of Székesfehérvár 
 (1593) Battle of Romhány
 Uprising in Banat
 (1594) Siege of Győr (Turkish: Yanık Kala, burned place, as a reference to the enormous damages caused by the siege).
 Battle of Călugăreni
 Battle of Giurgiu
 (1596) Siege of Esztergom
 Battle of Brest (1596)
 Siege of Eger (1596)
 Battle of Keresztes
 Serb Uprising of 1596–97
 (1597) Siege of Tata
 (1598) Siege of Győr 
 (1599) Siege of Buda
 Battle of Şelimbăr
 Kanizsa
 Battle of Mirăslău
 Battle of Guruslău
 (1601) Siege of Székesfehérvár
 Battle of Braşov
 (1603) Siege of Buda

References

Sources
 
 

 
1590s conflicts
1600s conflicts
Hungary under Habsburg rule
Ottoman period in the Balkans
Ottoman period in Hungary
Ottoman period in Romania
Rudolf II, Holy Roman Emperor
Wars involving the Habsburg monarchy
Wars involving the Ottoman Empire
Wars involving Croatia
16th century military history of Croatia
Wars involving Moldavia
Wars involving Wallachia
Wars involving Transylvania
1590s in Europe
1600s in Europe
1590s in the Ottoman Empire
1600s in the Ottoman Empire
16th century in Hungary
1600s in the Habsburg monarchy
17th century in Hungary
1590s in Romania
1600s in Romania
History of Wallachia (1512–1714)